The 12235/12236 Madhupur - Anand Vihar Terminal Humsafar Express is a superfast train belonging to Northern Railway zone that runs between Madhupur Junction and Anand Vihar Terminal of Delhi.

It is currently being operated with 22465/22466 train numbers on a weekly basis.

Coach Composition 

The trains has 3-tier AC and sleeper class type booking options. The trains designed by Indian Railways with features of LED screen display to show information about stations, train speed etc. and will have announcement system as well, Vending machines for tea, coffee and milk, Bio toilets in compartments as well as CCTV cameras.

Service

The 12235/Madhupur - Anand Vihar Terminal Humsafar Express has an average speed of 69 km/hr and covers 1236 km in 17h 50m.

The 12236/Anand Vihar Terminal - Madhupur Humsafar Express has an average speed of 68 km/hr and covers 1236 km in 18h 10m.

Route & Halts

Schedule

Traction

Both trains are hauled by WAP 5 / WAP 7 locomotive of Ghaziabad loco shed on its entire journey.

See also 

 Humsafar Express
 Madhupur Junction railway station
 Anand Vihar Terminal railway station

Notes

References 

Humsafar Express trains
Rail transport in Jharkhand
Transport in Delhi
Railway services introduced in 2019